John N. Wyhonic (December 23, 1919 – July 19, 1989) was an American football guard who played in the National Football League (NFL) for the Philadelphia Eagles from 1946–1947 and in the All-America Football Conference (AAFC) for the Buffalo Bills from 1948–1949. After playing college football for Alabama, he was drafted by the Eagles in the 14th round (123rd overall) of the 1942 NFL Draft. After serving in World War II for the Navy, he rejoined the Eagles in 1946.

References

1919 births
1989 deaths
People from Jefferson County, Ohio
Players of American football from Ohio
American football guards
Alabama Crimson Tide football players
United States Navy personnel of World War II
Philadelphia Eagles players
Buffalo Bills (AAFC) players